The 1974 Wills pre-season cup final was between Eastern Suburbs and the South Sydney.

Eastern Suburbs 43 (P. Kelly 3, Mark Harris 2, Bill Mullins 2, Elwyn Walters, Bruce Pickett, Tries; *John Brass 8 Goals.) defeated South Sydney 0

Eastern Suburbs were coached by Jack Gibson

Wills Cup